Len Crane (7 February 1928 – 24 May 2006) was an Australian rules footballer who played for South Melbourne and Hawthorn in the Victorian Football League (VFL). 

Crane made his VFL debut in 1947 with South Melbourne and played as a half back flanker. After four seasons with South Melbourne he moved to Hawthorn for the 1951 VFL season where he was used at full back and went on to represent Victoria in interstate football in 1953 and 1954. In 1954 Crane finished equal fourth in the Brownlow Medal count. From 1958 to 1961, Porta coached Mordialloc in the Victorian Football Association.

He was the brother of footballers Jack Crane and Tom Crane.

References

External links

1928 births
2006 deaths
Australian rules footballers from Melbourne
Sydney Swans players
Hawthorn Football Club players
Mordialloc Football Club players
Mordialloc Football Club coaches
People from South Melbourne